Nj Ayuk (born February 11, 1980) is a Cameroonian attorney, author, and businessman.

Ayuk is the founder and chief executive officer (CEO) of the Centurion Law Group, a Pan-African  law firm that operates in the energy, financial, and extractive sectors. He is also the executive chairman of the African Energy Chamber. He has previously been convicted of fraud.

Early life and education 
Ayuk was born in Cameroon. He studied at the University of Maryland, College Park, where he was mentored by Ron Walters, and earned a juris doctor from William Mitchell College of Law in the United States. He holds a master's degree in business administration (MBA) from the New York Institute of Technology.

Career 
Ayuk started his career at Baker Botts and then moved to the United Nations Development Programme. He also worked at Vanco Energy, eventually founding Centurion Law Group.

In 2007, he pleaded guilty today to "illegally using the stationery and signature stamp of a U.S. Congressman in a series of attempts to obtain visas to the United States for people from his native country of Cameroon," and was subsequently deported from the United States.

In 2015, independent investigative website Diario Rombe reported allegations that Ayuk was involved in the money laundering of $2.5 million in Ghana and transferring $1m to Ayuk's home country of Equatorial Guinea. Ayuk reportedly arrived at GT Bank there with two bags containing $2.5m in cash to deposit in a Centurion bank account.

In 2018, he launched CenturionPlus, an on-demand service for African lawyers and advisors to scale legal teams according to corporate and project requirements. Since 2018, Ayuk has been the executive chairman of the African Energy Chamber.

In 2022, the South African High Court ruled that Ayuk issued defamatory remarks towards the Organized Crime and Corruption Reporting Project and journalist Delfin Mocache Massoko with the intent to cause harm.

In 2023, the Mail & Guardian reported that bogus copyright complaints had been made under the Digital Millennium Copyright Act to attempt to remove unflattering material relating to Ayuk and a politician with whom he was associated. The complaints included the reporting of the Mail & Guardian about Ayuk's 2007 convictions.

Recognition 
In 2015, he was listed in Forbes' Top 10 Most Influential Men in Africa. In 2023, Ayuk was included in a list of 100 most reputable Africans who contributed to business and authorship.

Bibliography 
Books

 Nj, Ayuk (2021). Billions at play: The Future of African Energy and Doing Deals, USA: Made for Success Publishing, .
 Nj, Ayuk (2017). Big Barrels: African Oil and Gas and the Quest for Prosperity, USA: Clink Street Publishing, .
 Nj, Ayuk (2023) A Just Transition: Making Energy Poverty History with an Energy Mix, Made for Success, 

Articles

 Ayuk, Nj. (25 May 2021). "Net Zero? Not For Africa. Not Yet. Africa Must Fight Energy Poverty with Oil and Gas Development".
 Ayuk, Nj. "Energy Industry will be the bedrock of Africa’s Road to Recovery".
 Ayuk, Nj. (28 December 2020). "A Few Thoughts for this Generation of Africans in 2021: Be Bold and Cut Out Entitlement, No One Owes Us Anything".
 Ayuk, Nj (3 January 2020). "What will it take for 2020 to truly be the year of Gas in Nigeria?".

References

External links

 Official website

1980 births
Living people
Cameroonian lawyers
21st-century Cameroonian writers
William Mitchell College of Law alumni
New York Institute of Technology alumni